Harry Benson (born 1929) is a Scottish photographer.

Harry Benson may also refer to:
 Harry Benson (footballer) (1883–1953), English footballer
 Harry Benson (American football) (1909–1943), American football player
 Harry Benson, a 19th-century con artist - see Trial of the Detectives

See also
Henry Benson (disambiguation)
Harold Benson, see Benson's algorithm